Anna Bay is the name of a suburb, a town and a bay in the Port Stephens local government area in the Hunter Region of New South Wales, Australia. The suburb and town are immediately adjacent to the north-eastern end of Stockton Beach and provide one of the major entry points to the beach at Birubi Point. Both were named after the bay of the same name which is located in the adjacent suburb of One Mile. According to legend to it was originally called Hannah Bay after an alleged shipwreck in 1851 but the  vessel has never been identified. The name was changed by post service on 15 May 1896 as many locals were already referring to it as Anna Bay.

The Worimi people are the traditional owners of the Port Stephens area.

During World War II Stockton Beach was heavily fortified against a possible amphibious assault by Imperial Japanese forces and a line of tank traps was installed to prevent entry to the local area through the town. Many of the tank traps were removed after the war and now feature significantly around the car parking areas at Birubi Point. From here many tourists partake in organised beach tours and camel rides.

Gallery

Notes

References

External links

Anna Bay at Australian Explorer

Suburbs of Port Stephens Council
Towns in the Hunter Region
Beaches of New South Wales
Coastal towns in New South Wales